Abdullah Msheleh Al-Marzouq (born 19 July 1985) is a Kuwaiti footballer currently playing with Al Nasr in Kuwaiti Premier League. He previously played for Kuwait's Al-Tadamon before transferring to Omani club Al-Nasr in late 2010.

References

External links
 Football-Lineups player profile
 

1985 births
Living people
Kuwaiti footballers
Footballers at the 2006 Asian Games
Sportspeople from Kuwait City
Association football defenders
Asian Games competitors for Kuwait
Kuwait international footballers
Al-Sulaibikhat SC players
Al Tadhamon SC players
Al-Nasr SC (Salalah) players
Al-Nasr SC (Kuwait) players
Kuwait Premier League players
Oman Professional League players
Kuwaiti expatriate sportspeople in Oman
Expatriate footballers in Oman
Kuwaiti expatriate footballers